As of October 2021, there have been 105 amendments of the Constitution of India since it was first enacted in 1950.

There are three types of amendments to the Constitution of India of which second and third type of amendments are governed by Article 368.

 The first type of amendments includes that can be passed by "simple majority" in each house of the Parliament of India.
 The second type of amendments includes that can be effected by the parliament by a prescribed "special majority" in each house; and
 The third type of amendments includes those that require, in addition to such "special majority" in each house of the parliament, ratification by at least one half of the State Legislatures.

The third type amendments that are made to the constitution are amendments No. 3, 6, 7, 8, 13, 14, 15, 16, 22, 23, 24, 25, 28, 30, 31, 32, 35, 36, 38, 39, 42, 43, 44, 45, 46, 51, 54, 61, 62, 70, 73, 74, 75, 79, 84, 88, 95, 99 and 101.

Although constitutional amendments require the support of a two-thirds majority in both houses of Parliament (with some amendments requiring ratification by a majority of state legislatures), the Indian Constitution is the most amended national constitution in the world. The Constitution spells out governmental powers with so much detail that many matters addressed by statute in other democracies must be addressed via constitutional amendment in India. As a result, the Constitution is amended roughly twice a year.



List of Amendments

References

External links
 Pykih Data Visualization of Constitutional Amendments
 Know The Genesis of 103rd Constitutional Amendment

 
India law-related lists